Cipuropsis asmussii is a species of flowering plant in the family Bromeliaceae, native to Venezuela. It was first described by Eric J. Gouda in 2017.

References

Tillandsioideae
Flora of Venezuela
Plants described in 2017